The Sea of Memories is the fifth studio album by English alternative rock band Bush, released on 13 September 2011 through Zuma Rock Records, eOne Music and earMUSIC. It is the band's first studio album in ten years, following 2001's Golden State, and the first to be recorded with Chris Traynor and Corey Britz on lead guitar and bass, respectively. It is also the first Bush album released on E1 Records, marking their first venture away from Interscope (or Atlantic), who handled all of their previous releases. The album's title comes from a line in the song "Baby Come Home". The cover art is by Los Angeles-based street artist, RETNA.

Background and production
Originally intended for an autumn 2010 release, the working title for this album was Everything Always Now. The Sea of Memories was produced by Bob Rock. The album took more than a year to materialise with pre-production beginning in June 2010 and recording sessions wrapping up a year later.

Promotion
In an exclusive partnership with Electronic Arts, the band announced that they were offering a free download of "All My Life", which was made available on the video games' website. Another song by the band was set to be featured on the soundtrack to NHL 12; it was released on 25 July 2011 as another exclusive free download, "The Sound of Winter", but was also made available for download from the US iTunes.

The band appeared on Jimmy Kimmel Live! on 21 July, performing "The Sound of Winter" to promote the album. The band also performed the song on The Tonight Show with Jay Leno on 22 September and Discovery Channel's American Chopper Live on 6 December 2011. Their Chopper appearance marked the series' second highest rated episode to date.

Many of the songs from The Sea of Memories are on the soundtrack for Ski Channel film tour film Winter, starring Ted Ligety, Simon Dumont, Sean Pettit, Sarah Burke and numerous other action sport stars. "The Sound of Winter" is the title track for the film, which was directed by the founder of the Tennis Channel Steve Bellamy.

In January 2012 the band released the album's third single, "Baby Come Home". To promote the single the band appeared again on The Tonight Show with Jay Leno to perform the song on 2 February 2012.

Release and reception

Commercial performance
The album's lead single, "The Afterlife", originally released in June 2010, reached the top 40 on both the Hot Mainstream Rock Tracks (#34) and Alternative Songs (#22). The album's second single, "The Sound of Winter", released more than a year later in July 2011, fared better on the charts in North America, reaching the top ten on both the US Active Rock chart (#4) and the Hot Mainstream Rock Tracks (#3). The song topped the Alternative Songs on 18 October, becoming the first self-released single by an artist to reach number one on the chart, and later topped the Rock Songs chart, becoming the band's first number one single on the chart. In Canada the song also had good success, reaching #2 the Canadian Alternative Chart, number four on the Active Rock Chart and number 97 on the Canadian Hot 100. Released on 13 September 2011, The Sea of Memories sold 20,000 copies in the United States in its first week of release to land at number 18 on the Billboard 200 chart. The album peaked at number 18 on the Billboard 200, number 20 on the Top Digital Albums, number five on the Top Independent Albums and the Top Modern Rock/Alternative Albums and number eight on the Top Rock Albums.

Critical reception

The Sea of Memories received mixed reviews from music critics. At Metacritic, where they assign a "weighted average" rating out of 100 to selected independent ratings and reviews from mainstream critics, the album received a Metascore of a 51, based on 10 reviews, indicating "Mixed or average reviews." Stephen Thomas Erlewine of AllMusic gave the album 2 and a half out of 5 stars, stating, "The Sea of Memories is easily the most enjoyable collection of songs released under Bush's name." Rockfreaks.net praised the album and the tracks "The Sound of Winter", "She's a Stallion" and "Stand Up", stating, "'The Sea of Memories' is every bit as good as classic Bush." IGN gave the album 7 out of 10, stating, "Ultimately, Bush's return is far from perfect, but still proves to be a welcome return." Love-It-Loud.com gave a positive review, saying: "Whether the songs edge towards the old Bush alternative rock style or go for more of a pop-rock approach, they remain catchy and full of hooks, with Rossdale’s voice at the forefront, as strong as ever."

Many reviews were mostly mixed or negative, however. Kyle Anderson of Entertainment Weekly said that the album "adds exactly zero entries to the totally awesome Bush greatest-hits album that doesn't exist yet." Steven Hyden of The A.V. Club said that the album "plays like an endless replay of Rossdale's past musical miscues." Kevin Barber of Consequence of Sound said in an average review, "What The Sea of Memories does is inject some life into the Bush brand, proving that Rossdale isn't ready to call it a day." Enio Chiola of PopMatters said that the album "will most likely please those few Bush fans who've been hoping for a reunion, but it will not change the minds of those who relegated Bush to nothing more than a disingenuous rip-off of so many more brilliant '90s alterna-rock acts." Mikael Wood of Spin praised "The Afterlife" as a "big-chorused rocker", but added, "As for the ballads, you're better off YouTubing 'Glycerine' – or one of the tearjerkers ('Forever May You Run') from Rossdale's underappreciated 2008 solo disc."  Kerrang! gave the album a negative review and said of it, "As far as comebacks go, sadly, this is not a good one." Uncut also gave it two stars out of five and said, "Bob Rock's big production ladles on the reverb, merely emphasizing hollowness at the core."

Track listing
All songs written by Gavin Rossdale

Personnel

Bush
 Gavin Rossdale – lead vocals, rhythm guitar
 Chris Traynor – lead guitar
 Corey Britz – bass, backing vocals
 Robin Goodridge – drums

Additional musicians
 Jamie Muhoberac – keyboards

Technical personnel
 Jay Baumgardner – mixing
 John Ewing, Jr. – engineer, mixing
 Davis Factor – photography
 Matty Green – assistant
 Eric Helmkamp – engineer
 Ted Jensen – mastering
 Michael Moses – publicity
 Julian Peploe – artwork
 Nicole Perna – publicity
 Bob Rock – production
 Mark "Spike" Stent – mixing

Chart performance

Album

Singles

References

External links

Bush (British band) albums
2011 albums
Edel Music albums
Albums produced by Bob Rock
MNRK Music Group albums